Diplonychus is a genus of true bugs belonging to the family Belostomatidae.

The species of this genus are found in Southern Africa, Southeastern Asia and Australia.

Species:

Diplonychus annulatus 
Diplonychus eques 
Diplonychus esakii 
Diplonychus heeri 
Diplonychus rusticus 
Diplonychus stali 
Sphaerodema microcephalum

References

Belostomatidae